Pedro Miguel Baltazar Almeida (born 5 April 1993) is a Portuguese footballer who plays for C.F. Benfica as a right back.

Club career
Born in Porto Salvo, Oeiras, Almeida played youth football with S.L. Benfica from 2001 to 2011. Subsequently, he joined U.D. Leiria for his last year as a junior.

Almeida made his Primeira Liga debut on 29 April 2012, being one of only eight players fielded by Leiria – immerse in a deep financial crisis – in a 0–4 home loss against C.D. Feirense.

References

External links

1993 births
Living people
People from Oeiras, Portugal
Portuguese footballers
Association football defenders
Primeira Liga players
Liga Portugal 2 players
Segunda Divisão players
U.D. Leiria players
S.C.U. Torreense players
Atlético Clube de Portugal players
C.D. Mafra players
GS Loures players
Anorthosis Famagusta F.C. players
Portugal youth international footballers
Portuguese expatriate footballers
Expatriate footballers in Cyprus
Portuguese expatriate sportspeople in Cyprus
Sportspeople from Lisbon District